Handball has been a Bolivarian Games event since 2013 in Trujillo, Peru.

Men

Summary

Medal table

Participating nations

Women

Summary

Medal table

Participating nations

References

External links
 www.panamhandball.org